James Henry Atkinson (c. 1820 – 31 August 1873) was an English-born Australian politician.

He was born at Wakefield in Yorkshire. He ran a wool washing works at Botany Swamps before erecting a dam at Lachlan Swamps around 1849. He later expanded to become a fellmonger. In 1859 he was elected to the New South Wales Legislative Assembly for Central Cumberland, serving until his resignation due to insolvency in 1863. Atkinson died at Newtown in 1873.

References

 

1820s births
1873 deaths
Members of the New South Wales Legislative Assembly
19th-century Australian politicians
English emigrants to colonial Australia